George McDonald Church (born August 28, 1954) is an American geneticist, molecular engineer, chemist, and a serial entrepreneur who is widely regarded as the "Founding Father of Genomics", and a pioneer in personal genomics and synthetic biology. He is the Robert Winthrop Professor of Genetics at Harvard Medical School, Professor of Health Sciences and Technology at Harvard University and Massachusetts Institute of Technology, and a founding member of the Wyss Institute for Biologically Inspired Engineering at Harvard. Through his Harvard lab Church has co-founded around 50 biotech companies pushing the boundaries of innovation in the world of life sciences and making his lab as the hotbed of biotech startup activity in Boston. In 2018, the Church lab at Harvard made a record by spinning off 16 biotech companies in one year. The Church lab works on research projects that are distributed in diverse areas of modern biology like developmental biology, neurobiology, info processing, medical genetics, genomics, gene therapy, diagnostics, chemistry & bioengineering, space biology & space genetics, and ecosystem. Research and technology developments at the Church lab have impacted or made direct contributions to nearly all "next-generation sequencing (NGS)" methods and companies. In 2017, Time magazine listed him in Time 100, the list of 100 most influential people in the world. In 2022, he was featured among the most influential people in biopharma by Fierce Pharma, and was listed among the top 8 famous geneticists of all time in human history. , Church serves as a member of the Bulletin of the Atomic Scientists' Board of Sponsors, established by Albert Einstein.

Education and early life

George McDonald Church was born on August 28, 1954, on MacDill Air Force Base near Tampa, Florida, and grew up in nearby Clearwater. He attended high school at the preparatory boarding school Phillips Academy, in Andover, Massachusetts, from 1968 to 1972. He then studied at Duke University, completing a bachelor's degree in zoology and chemistry in two years.

In the fall of 1973, Church began research work at Duke University with assistant professor of biochemistry Sung-Hou Kim, work that continued a year later in a graduate biochemistry program at Duke on an NSF fellowship.

As Peter Miller reported on Church for the National Geographic series, "The Innovators":As a graduate student at Duke ... he used x-ray crystallography to study the three-dimensional structure of "transfer" RNA, which decodes DNA and carries instructions to other parts of the cell. It was groundbreaking research, but Church spent so much time in the lab—up to a hundred hours a week—that he neglected his other classes [in the fall of 1975].
As a result, Church was not compliant with Duke graduate academic policies, and was withdrawn from the degree program in January 1976. He was told that "[We] hope that whatever problems ... contributed to your lack of success ... at Duke will not keep you from a successful pursuit of a productive career." The work gave rise to publications that include a Proceedings report with Church as lead author on an early model for molecular interactions between the minor groove of double-stranded DNA and β-ribbons of proteins.

Church returned to graduate work at Harvard University in 1977 under Walter Gilbert, and completed a PhD in biochemistry and molecular biology working on mobile genetic elements within introns of yeast mitochondrial and mouse immunoglobulin genes (1984).

Career

After completing his doctoral work, Church spent six months of 1984 at Biogen, the industrial laboratory site where Gilbert had relocated a sizable part of his former Harvard group. This was followed soon after by a Life Sciences Research Foundation postdoctoral fellowship at the University of California, San Francisco with Gail R. Martin, a member of the National Academy of Sciences and joint-discoverer of a technique to extract mouse embryonic stem cells.

Church joined the Harvard Medical School faculty as an assistant professor in 1986. Church is now the Robert Winthrop Professor of Genetics at Harvard Medical School, and a member of the Harvard-MIT health sciences and technology faculty. He was also a founding member of the Wyss Institute for Biologically Inspired Engineering at Harvard University.

Church has served as director of the Center on Bioenergy Technology at Harvard, funded by a multiyear award from the U.S. Department of Energy, and of the Center of Excellence in Genomic Science (CEGS) at Harvard, funded by a P50-type award from the National Human Genome Research Institute (NHGRI), a part of the National Institutes of Health.

He co-founded Veritas Genetics and its European and Latin American subsidiary, Veritas Intercontinental, with the idea of bringing the benefits of genomic data to millions of people globally.

Church was elected a member of the National Academy of Engineering in 2012 for contributions to human genome sequencing technologies and DNA synthesis and assembly.

In 2018, Church co-founded Nebula Genomics, a personal genomics company that offers a whole-genome sequencing service. The company says that it is developing its own blockchain, with the purpose to improve privacy and security while also giving the possibility to people to have free sequencing in exchange of their genomic and personal data but, despite that, re-identification of people starting from the genetic data could still be possible (DNA itself is a unique identifier), law enforcement could still issue search warrants or subpoena the data and this technology, given also the fact that is hard to implement, could still be vulnerable to data breaches.

In 2021, Church joined as a co-founder of HLTH.network (formerly Shivom), a healthcare blockchain startup which created the world's first global genomics data sharing and analytics marketplace. The HLTH.network aims to be the "world's first base layer protocol for global health data."

George Church Institute of Regenesis: collaboration with BGI Group, China 

Since 2007, Church has served on scientific advisory board of the Chinese life sciences company BGI Group. In 2017, BGI established the George Church Institute of Regenesis, a research collaboration between Church's lab and about a dozen staffers at BGI in China. Dr. Xun Xu, Executive Director of BGI Group said, 
Professor George Church is a legend in this field for his creative achievements in gene editing and genome synthesis. With support of advanced technology platform of China National GeneBank, the collaboration between BGI and Professor Church will bring top resources and talents together to overcome current bottleneck issues and further improve the technology.

On February 18, 2020, Nebula Genomics, a personal genomics company founded by Church, announced that had partnered up with BGI; the saliva samples sent to Nebula Genomics for decoding are then sent by the company to BGI labs in Hong Kong for sequencing. Nebula Genomics said that this partnership was made to bring down the cost of whole-genome sequencing (they offer 30x whole-genome sequencing for $299), since normally it has a cost that makes it inaccessible to most people.

Research
Church is known for his professional contributions in the sequencing of genomes and interpreting such data, in synthetic biology and genome engineering, and in an emerging area of neuroscience that proposes to map brain activity and establish a "functional connectome". Church is known for pioneering the specialized fields of personal genomics and synthetic biology. He has co-founded commercial concerns spanning these areas, and others from green and natural products chemistry to infectious agent testing and fuel production, including Knome, LS9, and Joule Unlimited (respectively, human genomics, green chemistry, and solar fuel companies).

Church and the foundation of genomics
With Walter Gilbert, Church published the first direct genomic sequencing method in 1984. Described in that publication were the cyclic application of fluids to a solid phase alternating with imaging, plus avoidance of bacterial cloning, strategies that are still used in current dominant Next-Generation Sequencing technologies. These technologies began to affect genome-scale sequencing in 2005. Church also helped initiate the Human Genome Project in 1984. He invented the broadly applied concepts of molecular multiplexing and barcode tags, and his genome was the fifth whole human genome ever sequenced. Church was the first person to make his medical records and genome publicly available to researchers. Technology transfer of automated sequencing and software from his Harvard laboratory to Genome Therapeutics Corp. resulted in the first bacterial genome sequence and first commercial genome (the human pathogen Helicobacter pylori) in 1994. Church was co-inventor of nanopore sequencing in 1995, which is now commercially available (e.g. Oxford Nanopore Technologies), but not in the form embodied in Church's contribution to the original patents.

To aid in the interpretation and sharing of genomes, Church initiated the Personal Genome Project (PGP) in 2005, providing the world's only open-access human genome and trait data sets. Eight trios (mother, father, and child) from the Personal Genome Project are in the process of being chosen to act as the primary genome standards (reference materials) for the NIST+FDA genomeinabottle.org program.

Church furthermore announced his intention to publish his DNA via NFT and use the profits made through its sale to finance research conducted by Nebula Genomics. In June 2022 20 NFTs with his likeness were published instead of the originally planned NFTs of his DNA due to the market conditions at the time. Despite leading to mixed reactions the project is considered to be part of an effort to use the genetic data of 15,000 individuals to support genetic research. By using NFTs the project wants to ensure that the users submitting their genetic data are able to receive direct payment for their contributions.

Synthetic biology and genome engineering
Church has co-developed "genome engineering" technologies since 1997 via either general homologous recombination (recA and lambda-red) or via sequence-specific nucleases. Since 2004, his team has developed the use of DNA array (aka DNA chip) synthesizers for combinatorial libraries and assembling large genome segments. He co-developed Multiplex Automated Genome Engineering (MAGE) and optimized CRISPR/Cas9, discovered by Jennifer Doudna and Emmanuelle Charpentier for engineering a variety of genomes ranging from yeast to human. His laboratory's use of CRISPR in human induced pluripotent stem cells (hiPS) is the latest contender for precise gene therapy.

His team is the first to tackle a genome-scale change in the genetic code. This was done in a 4.7 million basepair genome of an industrially useful microbe (E. coli) with the goal of making a safer and more productive strain; this strain uses non-proteinogenic amino acids in proteins, and is metabolically and genetically isolated from other species.

He has co-invented several uses for DNA, including detectors for dark matter – Weakly interacting massive particles (WIMPs), anti-cancer "nano-robots", and strategies for digital data storage that are over a million times denser than conventional disk drives. Together with polymerase, DNA can be used to sense and store variation in photons, nucleotides, or ions.

The BRAIN initiative 
Church was part of a team who, in a 2012 scientific commentary, proposed a Brain Activity Map, later named BRAIN Initiative (Brain Research through Advancing Innovative Neurotechnologies).
They outlined specific experimental techniques that might be used to achieve what they termed a "functional connectome", as well as new technologies that will have to be developed in the course of the project, including wireless, minimally invasive methods to detect and manipulate neuronal activity, either utilizing microelectronics or synthetic biology. In one such proposed method, enzymatically produced DNA would serve as a "ticker tape record" of neuronal activity.

Gene therapy, ageing, and age reversal 
Church worked on engineered adeno-associated viral vectors to evade innate immune and inflammatory responses. The research was published in Science Translational Medicine in 2021 and showed the possibility of a less immunogenic gene therapy with the new TLR9-edited Adeno-associated viruses (AAV) as a safer viral vector. Based on the research, Church and a postdoc from his lab who was also the first-author of the research, co-founded Ally Therapeutics. In 2017, the Church lab at Harvard created adeno-associated virus (AAV)-based single combination gene therapy "for simultaneous treatment of several age-related diseases", detailing the technology's efficacy in mitigating obesity, type II diabetes, heart failure, and renal failure in mice, and the work was published in PNAS. In early 2018, Rejuvenate Bio was launched from the Church lab at the Wyss Institute at Harvard to prevent and treat several age-related diseases in dogs, extending their overall lifespan. In the February 2020, Rejuvenate Bio, the company co-founded by Church, received an exclusive worldwide license from the Harvard Office of Technology Development to commercialise their gene therapy technology. As the co-founder of Rejuvenate Bio in an interview Church said, 
Science hasn't yet found a way to make complex animals like dogs live forever, so the next best thing we can do is find a way to maintain health for as long as possible during the aging process.

Space biology and space genetics 
Church is a faculty member in the Consortium of Space Genetics at Harvard Medical School.

De-extinction, woolly mammoth revival project, and Colossal Biosciences
In March 2015, Church and his genetics research team at Harvard successfully copied some woolly mammoth genes into the genome of an Asian elephant. Using the CRISPR DNA editing technique, his group spliced genetic segments from frozen mammoth specimens, including genes from the ears, subcutaneous fat, and hair attributes, into the DNA of skin cells from a modern elephant. National Geographic, in an article titled "Mammoth-elephant hybrids could be created within the decade. Should they be?", reported, 
Church's dreams of engineering a hybrid mammoth first deepened after an interview he did with the New York Times in 2008 about efforts to sequence the woolly mammoth genome.

This marked the first time that woolly mammoth genes had been functionally active since the species became extinct. Their work has not been subject to peer review, however. Church stated that "Just making a DNA change isn't that meaningful. We want to read out the phenotypes." To do that, the team plans to perform further tests to get the hybrid cells into becoming specialized tissues, and from there attempting to turn the hybrid elephant/mammoth skin cells into hybrid embryos that can be grown in artificial wombs.

On September 13, 2021, Church founded a biosciences and genetics company, Colossal Biosciences, with entrepreneur Ben Lamm. The company is attempting to use genetic code to revive the woolly mammoth by equipping Asian elephants with mammoth traits.

Laetitia Garriott de Cayeux, founder-CEO of Global Space Ventures and an investor in Colossal Biosciences, said: 
In 2014, I asked my friend Elon Musk who he knew who was poised to make profound changes in the field of genomics, and he said: George Church. So in June 2014, I visited George at his lab in Boston. I immediately knew I'd be looking for an opportunity to collaborate with George. Global Space Ventures is excited to be backing Colossal.

Technology transfer, translational impact, and serial entrepreneurship
Through his Harvard lab Church has co-founded around 50 biotech companies, including Veritas Genetics (human genomics, 2014, with Mirza Cifric, Preston Estep, Yining Zhao, Joe Thakuria), Warp Drive Bio (natural products, 2011, with Greg Verdine and James Wells), Alacris (cancer systems therapeutics, 2010, with Hans Lehrach, Bernhard Herrmann, and Shahid Imran), Knome (human genomics, 2007, with Jorge Conde and Sundar Subramaniam), Pathogenica (microbe and viral NGS diagnostics, 2009, with Yemi Adesokan), AbVitro (immunomes, 2010, with Francois Vigneault), Gen9 Bio (synthetic biology, 2009, with Joseph Jacobson and Drew Endy), EnEvolv (Genome Engineering), Joule Unlimited (SolarFuels, 2007, with Noubar Afeyan and David Berry), LS9 (green chemistry, 2005, with Chris Somerville, Jay Keasling, Vinod Khosla, Noubar Afeyan, and David Berry), and ReadCoor (spatial biology, 2016, with Richard Terry and Evan R. Daugharthy).

He has participated in technology development, licensing patents and advising most of the Next-Generation Sequencing companies, including Complete Genomics, Life Technologies, Illumina, Danaher Corporation, Roche Diagnostics, Pacific Biosciences, Genia, and Nabsys.

He was on the Scientific Advisory Board of Cambrian Genomics.

He is currently on the Scientific Advisory Board of Seed.

He is a co-founder of Genome Project-Write.

He is a founding Board Member of the International Center for Genetic Disease (iCGD) at Brigham and Women's Hospital, Harvard Medical School, which focuses on the analysis of patients and healthy subjects from different parts of the world for genetics research into human disease and health.

Support of open consent
Church spearheaded the concept and implementation of open access sequencing hardware and shareable human medical data. He has noted the potential for re-identification of human research participants and the tendency for consent forms to be opaque – proposing an alternative "open consent" mechanism. He has participated in the Presidential Commission for the Study of Bioethical Issues, cautioning about the risk of synthetic DNA and proposing risk-reduction via licensing and surveillance. His laboratory has a major bio-safety engineering focus.

Support of open education
Church has been an early advocate of online, open education since 2002. He is advisor to the Personal Genetics Education Project and has spent a day teaching at The Jemicy School. He has championed citizen science, especially in the fields of synthetic biology and personal genomics. Since 2008, his team has been hosting an annual Genomes, Environments and Traits (GET) Conference with free online videos.

Rapid Deployment Vaccine Collaborative
Church is a member of the Rapid Deployment Vaccine Collaborative (RaDVaC), a group formed early in the SARS-CoV-2 pandemic to create an easily produced, free and open-source vaccine for self-administration.

Controversies
Church was partly funded from 2005 to 2007 by the nonprofit Jeffrey Epstein VI Foundation, a private foundation established by convicted sex offender Jeffrey Epstein. The affiliation was listed as for cutting-edge science and education. In his 2019 apology for "poor awareness" of Epstein's sex offender status, Church said he had "nerd tunnel vision" and articles on Epstein's crimes were unclear to him, placing responsibility on vetting donors on the development office.

Church faced criticism for his response to a question from Der Spiegel where he speculated that it could be technically possible to make a Neanderthal by reconstructing its DNA and modifying living human cells accordingly. Church pointed out that he was not working on such a project.

Popular science
In his science and popular efforts, Church has promoted open access genome sequencing and shareable human medical data, as well as online, open education and citizen science.

Church authored the 2012 New Scientist's "top science book", Regenesis: How Synthetic Biology Will Reinvent Nature and Ourselves with Ed Regis. He has participated in news interviews and videos including at TED, TEDx, and TEDMED venues, at PBS's Charlie Rose, Faces of America, and NOVA, as well as at PopSci, EG, and The Colbert Report. He is a regular contributor to Edge.org publications and videos and is a member of the Xconomists, an ad hoc team of editorial advisors for the tech news and media company, Xconomy.

In 2015, Jeneen Interlandi wrote an aritcle on Church for Popular Science titled "The Church Of George Church: From reviving extinct species to hunting for dark matter, can a single scientist transform biology--and our lives?", where she states:

Like an engineer, he (George Church) tends to see the universe not as a disparate set of mysteries but as a machine with a vast array of buttons and levers, each begging to be pushed and pulled.

Awards and honors
Church has received accolades including election to the National Academy of Sciences (in 2011), and the National Academy of Engineering (in 2012). He received the American Society for Microbiology Promega Biotechnology Research Award and the Bower Award and Prize for Achievement in Science of the Franklin Institute. He authored the NewScientist "top science book", Regenesis (on synthetic biology) with Ed Regis.

Other honors include the Triennial International Steven Hoogendijk Award in 2010 and the Scientific American Top 50 twice (for "Designing artificial life" in 2005 and "The $1000 genome" in 2006). Newsweek picked Church for their 2008 "Power of Ideas" recognition in the category of Medicine (for the Personal Genome Project). In September 2010, Church was honored for his work in genetics with the Mass High Tech All-Star Award.

He is a member of the Research Advisory Board of SENS Research Foundation.

Personal life
Church is married to fellow Harvard Medical School faculty member in genetics Ting Wu.

Church has been outspoken in his support of following a vegan lifestyle, for reasons concerned with health, and with environmental and moral issues. When asked about his dietary choice, Church replied, "I've been vegan off-and-on since 1974 when I was inspired by participating in an MIT nutritional study, and quite strictly since 2004." He goes on to elaborate 4 reasons:medical (cholesterol in fish & dairy), energy conservation (up to 20-fold impact), cruelty ("organic" animals are deprived of medicines that humans use), and risks of spreading pathogens (not just the flu) ... [noting that] veganism is an issue for which personal and global love of life, health and wealth align. It's a pity to lose parts of our humanity and planet just due to a lack of recipes.

George identifies as a sentientist. Sentientism is a naturalistic worldview that grants moral consideration to all sentient beings.

In the context of the Personal Genome Project, journalists at Forbes and Wired have noted Church's openness about his health issues, including dyslexia, narcolepsy, and high cholesterol (one of the motivations for his vegan diet).

Church collaborated with transhumanist entrepreneur James Clement on the Supercentenarian Research Study, which aims to sequence the genomes of supercentenarians in hopes of discovering potential genetic factors behind their longevity.

Further reading
 
 
 Alex Salton, 2009, "Geneticist George Church '72 Sought Independence at PA", The Phillipian, April 17, 2009, see Geneticist George Church '72 Sought Independence at PA. Retrieved March 2, 2015.
 David Ewing Duncan, 2010, "On a Mission to Sequence the Genomes of 100,000 People: The geneticist George Church advises or licenses technology to most companies involved in sequencing, The New York Times, June 7, 2010, see On a Mission to Sequence the Genomes of 100,000 People. Retrieved February 26, 2015.
 Jeffrey M. Perkel, 2011, "Charting the Course: Three gene jockeys share their thoughts on past and future tools of the trade", in The Scientist (online), October 1, 2011. see Charting the Course. Retrieved February 26, 2015.
 Heidi Legg, 2014, "Harvard Professor George Church and the future of genomics", at BetaBoston, a Boston Globe site (online), December 25, 2014, see Harvard Professor George Church and the future of genomics | BetaBoston. Retrieved March 2, 2015.
 Peter Miller, 2015, "News, The Innovators Project: George Church, The Future Without Limits", National Geographic (online), see . Retrieved February 26, 2015.
 Matthew Allen, 2015, "Artificial Natures (interview with George Church)", Harvard Design Magazine (online), see Artificial Natures. Retrieved February 10, 2016.

References

External links
 The future of genetic codes and BRAIN codes (Dr. Church's seminar at the NIH on February 8, 2017)

20th-century American biochemists
21st-century American biochemists
American geneticists
Human geneticists
Synthetic biologists
Systems biologists
Biogerontologists
Howard Hughes Medical Investigators
Harvard Medical School faculty
Duke University alumni
Harvard Medical School alumni
Phillips Academy alumni
Members of the United States National Academy of Engineering
Members of the United States National Academy of Sciences
American transhumanists
People with narcolepsy
Scientists with dyslexia
People from Boston
People from Tampa, Florida
1954 births
Living people
Sentientists
Fellows of the American Academy of Microbiology
Life extensionists